Maria Manuela Guerra Lima Cortez e Almeida (born 26 January 1935) is a Portuguese actress. She co-starred in the film A Mãe é que Sabe.  Her television credits include Santa Bárbara, Doce Fugitiva, Deixa Que Te Leve, Remédio Santo and Mundo ao Contrário.

Maria was born in Lisbon.

External links

Portuguese actresses
Living people
1935 births